Benguelasa is a genus of moths in the family Gelechiidae.

Species
 Benguelasa major Bidzilya & Mey, 2011
 Benguelasa minor Bidzilya & Mey, 2011

References

Gelechiinae